Zakariya (also transliterated as Zakaria, Zakariyya, Zekariya, Zakaryah etc,  or زَكَرِيَّا) is a masculine given name, the Arabic form of Zechariah which is of Hebrew origin, meaning "God has remembered".

Ancient times
Zakariya, the father of John the Baptist (Yahya)

Medieval era
Zakariyya al-Ansari (c.1420–1520), Egyptian historian and Islamic scholar
Zakariya al-Qazwini, Persian physician
Abu Bakr Muhammad ibn Zakariya al-Razi (865–925), also known as "Razi" and "Rhazes", Persian physician, philosopher and scholar
Baha-ud-din Zakariya, Indian Sufi saint
Abu Zakariya, founder and first ruler of the Hafsid dynasty in Ifriqiya

Modern times

Given name
Zakaria Abdulla (born 1956?), Kurdish singer
Zakariyya Ahmad (1896–1961), Egyptian musician and composer
Zakaria Alaoui, Moroccan football goalkeeper
Zekeriya Alp, Turkish businessman
Zakaria Amara, accused of plotting terrorist attacks against targets in southern Ontario
Zakaria Azmi, Egyptian politician
Zakaria Botros (born 1934), Coptic priest from Egypt
Zakaria Charara, Lebanese footballer
Zekeria Ebrahimi (born 1996), Afghan actor known for The Kite Runner
Zakariya Essabar, Moroccan al-Qaeda member
Zakaria Goneim (1905–1959), Egyptian archaeologist
Zakaria Khan, birth name of Indian actor Jayant
Zakaria Labyad, Moroccan Footballer
Zakaria Mohieddin (born 1918), Egyptian military officer, former Prime Minister of Egypt
Zakariyyā Mūsawiy (born 1968), French citizen convicted of conspiracy to kill
Zakaria Al Omari, Syrian footballer
Zekeriya Sertel (1890–1980), Turkish journalist
Zakaria Tamer (born 1931), Syrian author 
Zakaria Zubeidi, Palestinian militant leader
Zakaria Zuffri, Indian cricketer
Zakaria bin Muhammad Amin (1913–2006), Indonesian ulama

Middle name
Hanadi Zakaria al-Hindi, first Saudi female commercial airline pilot
Muhammad Zakariya al-Kandahlawi, Sunni Muslim scholar of the Indian subcontinent
Teuku Zakaria bin Teuku Nyak Puteh (1929–1973), birth name of Malaysian film actor, director and songwriter P. Ramlee
Wilhelmus Zakaria Johannes (1895–1952), Indonesian doctor

Surname
Arif Zakaria, Indian actor
Asif Zakaria, Indian politician
Denis Zakaria, Swiss footballer of Congolese descent
Fareed Zakaria, Indian-American journalist and author
Ibrahim Zakaria, multiple people
Mohammed Zakariya, American calligrapher
Moufdi Zakaria, Algerian poet and writer

See also
Az-Zakariyya, Palestinian village depopulated in the 1948 Arab-Israeli War
Bahauddin Zakariya University
Zechariah (given name)
Zacharias (surname)
Zechariah (disambiguation)

References

Arabic-language surnames
Arabic masculine given names
Turkish masculine given names